Meshaal Al-Mutairi (born 6 April 1984) is a Saudi Arabian football player.

External links
 
 
 Meshaal Al-Mutairi at slstat.com

1984 births
Living people
Saudi Arabian footballers
Al Nassr FC players
Al-Faisaly FC players
Al-Riyadh SC players
Al-Shoulla FC players
Saudi First Division League players
Saudi Professional League players
Association football defenders